Degerfors railway station is a railway station in Degerfors, Sweden.

The station opened in 1866.

See also 

 Rail transport in Sweden

References 

Buildings and structures in Degerfors Municipality
Railway stations in Örebro County
1866 establishments in Sweden